Ralph Edmund Stanley (February 25, 1927 – June 23, 2016) was an American bluegrass artist, known for his distinctive singing and banjo playing.  Stanley began playing music in 1946, originally with his older brother Carter Stanley as part of The Stanley Brothers, and most often as the leader of his band, The Clinch Mountain Boys. He was also known as Dr. Ralph Stanley.

He was part of the first generation of bluegrass musicians and was inducted into both the International Bluegrass Music Hall of Honor and the Grand Ole Opry.

Biography

Stanley was born, grew up, and lived in rural Southwest Virginia—"in a little town called McClure at a place called Big Spraddle, just up the holler" from where he moved in 1936 and lived ever since in Dickenson County. The son of Lee and Lucy Stanley, Ralph did not grow up around a lot of music in his home.  As he says, his "daddy didn't play an instrument, but sometimes he would sing church music.  And I'd hear him sing songs like 'Man of Constant Sorrow,' 'Pretty Polly' and 'Omie Wise.'"

He learned to play the banjo, clawhammer style, from his mother:

He graduated from high school on May 2, 1945, and was inducted into the Army on May 16, serving "little more than a year." He immediately began performing when he got home:

Clinch Mountain Boys

After considering a course in "veterinary", he decided instead to join his older guitar-playing brother Carter Stanley (1925–1966) to form the Clinch Mountain Boys in 1946. Drawing heavily on the musical traditions of the area, which included the unique singing style of the Primitive Baptist Universalist church and the sweet down-home family harmonies of the Carter Family, the two Stanley brothers began playing on local radio stations.  They first performed at Norton, Virginia's WNVA, but did not stay long there, moving on instead to Bristol, Virginia, and WCYB to start the show Farm and Fun Time, where they stayed "off and on for 12 years".

At first they covered "a lot of Bill Monroe music" (one of the first groups to pick up the new "bluegrass" format).  They soon "found out that didn't pay off—we needed something of our own.  So we started writing songs in 1947, 1948.  I guess I wrote 20 or so banjo tunes, but Carter was a better writer than me." When Columbia Records signed them as The Stanley Brothers, Bill Monroe left in protest and joined Decca.  Later, Carter went back to sing for the "Father of Bluegrass", Bill Monroe.

Ralph Stanley gave his opinion on Bill Monroe's apparent change of heart: "He [Bill Monroe] knew Carter would make him a good singer ... Bill Monroe loved our music and loved our singing."

The Stanley Brothers joined King Records in the late '50s, a record company so eclectic that it included James Brown at the time.  In fact, James Brown and his band were in the studio when the Stanley Brothers recorded "Finger Poppin' Time". "James and his band were poppin' their fingers on that" according to Ralph.  At King Records, they "went to a more 'Stanley style', the sound that people most know today."

Ralph and Carter performed as The Stanley Brothers with their band, The Clinch Mountain Boys, from 1946 to 1966. Ralph kept the band name when he continued as a solo act after Carter's death, from 1967 until his death in 2016.

Solo
After Carter died of complications of cirrhosis in 1966, after ailing for "a year or so", Ralph faced a hard decision on whether to continue performing on his own. "I was worried, I didn't know if I could do it by myself.  But boy, I got letters, 3,000 of 'em, and phone calls ... I went to Syd Nathan at King and asked him if he wanted me to go on, and he said, 'Hell yes! You might be better than both of them.'"

He decided to go it alone, eventually reviving The Clinch Mountain Boys. Larry Sparks, Roy Lee Centers, and Charlie Sizemore were among those with whom he played in the revived band.  He encountered Ricky Skaggs and Keith Whitley arriving late to his own show: "They were about 16 or 17, and they were holding the crowd 'til we got there ... They sounded just exactly like (the Stanley Brothers)." Seeing their potential, he hired them "to give 'em a chance", though that meant a seven-member band. Eventually, his son, Ralph Stanley II, took over as lead singer and rhythm guitarist for The Clinch Mountain Boys. His grandson Nathan Stanley became the last lead singer and band leader for The Clinch Mountain Boys.

Clinch Mountain Boys members

1967 to 2016

Ralph Stanley (Lead vocalist, banjo)
Jack Cooke (bass)
Curly Ray Cline (fiddle)
George Shuffler (guitar, bass)
Melvin Goins (bass, guitar)
Larry Sparks (Lead vocalist, guitar)
Roy Lee Centers (Lead vocalist, guitar)
Ricky Skaggs (mandolin, fiddle)
Keith Whitley (Lead vocalist, guitar)
Charlie Sizemore (Lead vocalist, guitar)
Hook n Beans {Buddy Moore } lead singer- guitar
Ricky Lee (guitar)
Junior Blankenship (guitar)
Kenneth Davis (guitar)
Renfro Proffit (guitar)
Ron Thomason (mandolin)
Steve Sparkman (banjo)
James Alan Shelton (guitar)
Sammy Adkins (Lead vocalist, guitar)
Todd Meade (fiddle)
Ralph 'Hank' Smith (Lead guitar)
Ernie Thacker (Lead vocalist, guitar, mandolin)
John Rigsby (mandolin)
Dewey Brown (fiddle),(Vocals)
Jimmy Cameron (Bass), (Vocals)
Audey Ratliff (bass)
Ralph Stanley II (Lead vocalist, guitar)
Nathan Stanley (mandolin, Lead vocalist, guitar)
James Price (fiddle)
Randall Joe Hibbitts (bass)
Mitchell Van Dyke (banjo)
Jarrod Church (banjo)
Alex Hibbitts (Mandolin)
Jimmie Vaughan  (Rhythm Guitar, Vocals)

Political career
Around 1970, he ran for Clerk of Court and Commissioner of Revenue in Dickenson County only to state this:

O Brother, Where Art Thou?
Stanley's work was featured in the very popular 2000 film O Brother, Where Art Thou?, in which he sings the Appalachian dirge "O Death".  The soundtrack's producer was T-Bone Burnett. Stanley said the following about working with Burnett:

With that song, Stanley won a 2002 Grammy Award in the category of Best Male Country Vocal Performance. "That put the icing on the cake for me," he said.  "It put me in a different category."

Later life
He was known in the world of bluegrass music by the popular title, "Dr. Ralph Stanley", having been awarded an honorary doctorate in music from Lincoln Memorial University of Harrogate, Tennessee in 1976. Stanley was inducted into the International Bluegrass Music Hall of Honor in 1992 and in 2000, and became the first person to be inducted into the Grand Ole Opry in the third millennium.

He joined producers Randall Franks and Alan Autry for the In the Heat of the Night cast CD Christmas Time's A Comin''', performing "Christmas Time's A Comin'" with the cast on the CD released on Sonlite and MGM/UA; it was one of the most popular Christmas releases of 1991 and 1992 with Southern retailers.

He was featured in the Josh Turner hit song "Me and God" released in 2006.

In 2006, he was awarded the National Medal of Arts.

On November 10, 2007, Stanley and the Clinch Mountain Boys performed at a rally for presidential candidate John Edwards in Des Moines, Iowa, just before the Democratic Party's annual Jefferson-Jackson Day Dinner.  Between renditions of "Man of Constant Sorrow" and "Orange Blossom Special", Stanley told the crowd that he had cast his first vote for Harry S. Truman in 1948 and would cast his next for John Edwards in 2008. In October 2008,  he performed in a radio advertisement for Barack Obama's presidential campaign.

Country singer Dwight Yoakam has stated that Ralph Stanley is one of his "musical heroes".

Stanley's autobiography, Man of Constant Sorrow, coauthored with the music journalist Eddie Dean, was released by Gotham Books on October 15, 2009. In 2012, Stanley was featured on several tracks of the soundtrack for Nick Cave's film Lawless, with music by Cave and Warren Ellis. His solo track "White Light/White Heat" is prominent in several scenes of the movie.

Stanley maintained an active touring schedule; appearances in his later years included the 2012 Muddy Roots Music Festival in Cookeville, Tennessee, and the 2013 FreshGrass Festival in North Adams, Massachusetts. In June 2013, he announced a farewell tour, scheduled to begin in Rocky Mount, North Carolina, on October 18 and extending to December 2014. However, upon notification of being elected as a fellow of the American Academy of Arts and Sciences (awarded October 11, 2014) a statement on his own website appeared, saying that he would not be retiring.

On June 23, 2016, Stanley died at age 89 as a result of skin cancer.

Musical style

Stanley created a unique style of banjo playing, sometimes called "Stanley style". It evolved from Wade Mainer style two-finger technique, later influenced by Scruggs style, which is a three-finger technique. "Stanley style" is distinguished by incredibly fast "forward rolls", led by the index finger (instead of the thumb, as in Scruggs style), sometimes in the higher registers using a capo. In "Stanley style", the rolls of the banjo are continuous, while being picked fairly close to the bridge on the banjo, giving the tone of the instrument a very crisp, articulate snap to the strings as the player would strike them.

Selected discography

With Joe IsaacsGospel Gathering (1995, Freeland)

Other contributionsLifted: Songs of the Spirit (2002, Sony/Hear Music) – "Listen to the Shepherd"Re:Generation Music Project soundtrack (2012) – "Wayfaring Stranger"

Honors, awards, distinctions

Stanley was widely known in the world of bluegrass music by the popular title, "Dr. Ralph Stanley," after being awarded an honorary Doctor of Music from Lincoln Memorial University in Harrogate, Tennessee, in 1976.
He was a recipient of a 1984 National Heritage Fellowship awarded by the National Endowment for the Arts, which is the United States government's highest honor in the folk and traditional arts.
He was inducted into the International Bluegrass Music Hall of Honor in 1992 and in 2000.
Between 1993 and 2015, Stanley was nominated for 15 Grammy Awards in various categories.
He became the first person to be inducted into the Grand Ole Opry in the third millennium.
His work was featured in the 2000 film O Brother, Where Art Thou?, in which he sings the Appalachian dirge "O Death". That song won him a 2002 Grammy Award in the category of Best Male Country Vocal Performance.
His 2002 collaborative recording with Jim Lauderdale titled Lost in the Lonesome Pines won the Grammy Award for Best Bluegrass Album at the 45th Annual Grammy Awards.
The Virginia Press Association made him their Distinguished Virginian of the Year in 2004.
The Ralph Stanley Museum and Traditional Mountain Music Center opened in Clintwood, Virginia in 2004.
He was awarded the National Medal of Arts in 2006, the nation's highest honor for artistic excellence.
The Virginia legislature designated him the Outstanding Virginian of 2008.
He was awarded the Key to the City of Garner, North Carolina on November 15, 2008.
He was named a Library of Congress Living Legend in April 2000.
He was inducted into the Virginia Musical Museum & Virginia Music Hall of Fame in 2013.
He received a second honorary Doctor of Music degree from Yale University on May 19, 2014.
He became an elected fellow of the American Academy of Arts and Sciences on October 11, 2014.
From the January 2, 2015 death of Little Jimmy Dickens until his own death, Stanley was the oldest living member of the Grand Ole Opry''.

References

External links

 
 Ralph Stanley Discography
 
 
Ralph Stanley Interview NAMM Oral History Library (2013)

1927 births
2016 deaths
20th-century American musicians
20th-century Christian universalists
21st-century American musicians
21st-century Christian universalists
American banjoists
Bluegrass musicians from Virginia
American Christian universalists
American country singer-songwriters
American country banjoists
American male singer-songwriters
Baptists from Virginia
Deaths from skin cancer
Deaths from cancer in Virginia
Grammy Award winners
Grand Ole Opry members
National Heritage Fellowship winners
People from Dickenson County, Virginia
Rebel Records artists
Singer-songwriters from Virginia
United States National Medal of Arts recipients
Fellows of the American Academy of Arts and Sciences
20th-century American male musicians
21st-century American male musicians
20th-century Baptists
United States Army personnel of World War II